For the figure in Norse mythology, see Urðr
The University Teachers for Human Rights (Jaffna) or  UTHR(J) was formed in 1988 at the University of Jaffna, Jaffna, in Sri Lanka, as part of the national organization University Teachers for Human Rights. Its public activities as a constituent part of university life came to a standstill after the assassination on September 21, 1989 of Rajini Thiranagama, a key founding member, allegedly by the rebel group Liberation Tigers of Tamil Eelam, though the Tamil weekly Thinamurasu blamed the EPRLF for the killing.

In 1990, the others who identified openly with the UTHR(J), such as its current head, Professor Rajan Hoole, were forced to leave Jaffna.

It functions as an organization upholding the founding spirit of the UTHR(J) with its original aims: to challenge the external and internal terror engulfing the Sri Lankan Tamil community as a whole through making the perpetrators accountable and to create space for humanizing the social and political spheres relating to the life of the community. The UTHR(J)'s long-held ideal is that "the due rights of the minorities, taking into account Sinhalese concerns, could ideally be met in a united Sri Lanka under federalism."

The UTHR(J) no longer functions in the University of Jaffna. Its latest report on documenting human rights abuses in Sri Lanka, as seen from its website, was on January 2, 2010.

Reception 
The UTHR(J) is well-received by human rights NGOs such as the Human Rights Watch. In 2007 Rajan Hoole and Kopalasingham Sritharan, cofounders of the group, received the Martin Ennals Award for Human Rights Defenders.

Due to government censorship of the war, the UTHR(J) became the main source of information on the war zones for foreign governments, NGOs and the media. In 2001 the then Sri Lankan President Chandrika Kumaratunga endorsed the UTHR(J), claiming it had appreciated her human rights record, when she was asked about the allegations of human rights abuses against Tamils under her government.

However, the UTHR(J) has also come under criticism from certain quarters. Brian Senewiratne, a Sinhalese advocate of Tamil Eelam who had written the foreword to its book ‘The Broken Palmyra’, alleged that the group “has changed to simply being virulently anti-LTTE,” and that the Sri Lankan government was using its reports to cover up human rights violations. The University of Jaffna, where the UTHR(J) was formed, has repeatedly disclaimed any connection with the group and published a letter in 1996 dismissing its reports on the LTTE as being “based on hearsay”. Tamil diaspora activists and organizations have also accused the UTHR(J) of having an anti-LTTE bias and of praising Sri Lankan Army officers involved in human rights abuses. Among scholarly critiques, the UTHR(J) has also been criticized for the use of “fascist” as a pejorative being exclusively reserved for the LTTE, which is described as “sensationalist characterization” without any theoretical basis.

See also
Human Rights in Sri Lanka

References

Home Page of UTHR

Human rights organisations based in Sri Lanka
1988 establishments in Sri Lanka
University of Jaffna
Organizations established in 1988